Peroni S.p.A. is a company headquartered in Gallarate, Italy. Peroni is an Italian brand that is worldwide known by theatrical productions because of its manufacturing of cycloramas, theater drapes and stage curtains and other materials for scenography.

History
Peroni established a weaving mill near the end of 18th Century in Gallarate, a city in the main cotton weaving industrial district of Lombardy, in Northwest Italy.
The firm had been producing cotton and linen blankets for more than a hundred years when, at the beginning of 20th Century, it began the manufacturing of big size cotton fabrics for scenic painting like canvas and later cotton tulle that became its main products.
Around 1980 Peroni also started the manufacturing of vinyl projection screens and rear-projection screens, these last widely used for stage lighting too by theatrical shows, and that of stage machineries.
The company is still owned and managed by the founder family and nowadays it seems to be constantly involved in the production of important shows as it is witnessed by the many examples that can be watched in its website.

References

External links
Peroni S.p.A. website

Italian brands
Textile companies of Italy